Andrew M. "Drew" Gattine (born November 30, 1962) is an American politician serving as chair of the Maine Democratic Party. He was previously a member of the Maine House of Representatives for the 34th district from 2012 to 2020.

Career 
Gattine is from Westbrook, Maine. In the 128th Maine Legislature he served as the chair of the House Appropriations and Financial Affairs Committee. He previously served as the chair of the House Health and Human Services Committee. In August 2016, Paul LePage, the governor of Maine, left an "obscene, threatening" voicemail for Gattine in which he accused Gattine of calling him racist. LePage later stated that he wished he could challenge Gattine to a duel.

References

External links

1962 births
21st-century American politicians
Living people
Democratic Party members of the Maine House of Representatives
Politicians from Westbrook, Maine